The Castle of Aznalmara (Spanish: Castillo de Aznalmara) is a castle located in Ubrique, Spain. It was declared Bien de Interés Cultural in 1993.

References 

Bien de Interés Cultural landmarks in the Province of Cádiz
Castles in Andalusia
Ruined castles in Spain